Ratford is a hamlet near Calne in the county of Wiltshire, England, with a population of approximately 50.

Other nearby settlements include the villages of Derry Hill and Studley.

The hamlet surrounds a crossing of the Cowage Brook, a tributary of the River Marden; the Cowage Brook is joined here by Fisher's Brook. Land to the south of Cowage Brook is in the civil parish of Calne Without while land to the north is in Bremhill parish.

The first houses were probably built here in the late 17th century or early 18th. The single-arch stone bridge over the brook is probably from the late 18th century. Some cottages were built in the 19th century by the Bowood estate.

The name Rattle was used in the past, appearing on the 1925 Ordnance Survey map, but by 1938 the name Ratford was is use.

The local pub is the Dumb Post Inn, on the north side of Ratford on the lane to Bremhill. Between 1900 and c. 1970 there was a Baptist mission room near the brook.

References 

Calne Without
Hamlets in Wiltshire